Sir Robert Heaton Rhodes  (27 February 1861 – 30 July 1956), usually known as Sir Heaton Rhodes, was a New Zealand politician and lawyer.

Life
Rhodes was born in Purau on Banks Peninsula, the son of sheep farmer and politician Robert Heaton Rhodes. He went to England to attend Hereford Cathedral School and then studied at Brasenose College, Oxford, from which he graduated in 1884. He was called to the bar by the Inner Temple in 1887.

He then returned to New Zealand, joined the New Zealand Mounted Rifles Brigade, and served in the Second Boer War in 1902 with the 8th New Zealand Contingent. He later went on to command the 1st Mounted Rifles in the New Zealand Territorial Force. After retirement he was Honorary Colonel of the 1st Mounted Rifles.

Rhodes represented the Ellesmere electorate in the House of Representatives from 1899 to 1925, during which time he joined the Reform Party. He retired in 1925 and was appointed to the Legislative Council, in which he served until 1941, with a short break between 1932 and 1934.

He served as Postmaster-General and Minister for Public Health, Hospitals and Tourist Resorts in the Cabinet from 1912 to 1915, when he was appointed Special Commissioner to Egypt and Galilee to report on the conditions of New Zealand troops serving there. In 1916 he moved to Europe as Commissioner of the New Zealand Red Cross.

In 1920 he returned to New Zealand and was appointed Minister of Defence. In 1922 he was also appointed as Commissioner of State Forests and held both posts until 1926. From 1926 to 1928 he was Deputy Leader of the Legislative Council and minister without portfolio. In 1927 he was Minister in attendance upon the Duke and Duchess of York on their visit to New Zealand. He was vice-president of the Victoria League for Commonwealth Friendship in Canterbury in the 1930s.

He bred pedigree cattle at Otahuna, Tai Tapu, where he also grew daffodils.

Philately
Rhodes was an advanced philatelist. He had a large collection of New Zealand Chalon head postage stamps. He was President of the Royal Philatelic Society of New Zealand and signed the Roll of Distinguished Philatelists in 1949.

Honours and awards
For his role as the commissioner of the New Zealand Red Cross, Rhodes was appointed Knight Commander of the Order of the British Empire (KBE) in the 1920 New Year Honours. For his role of dealing with the Duke and Duchess of York he was appointed Knight Commander of the Royal Victorian Order (KCVO) in July 1927. He was awarded the King George V Silver Jubilee Medal in 1935.
 Commander of the Order of the British Empire (Great Britain)
 Chevalier de la Légion d'Honneur (France)

Footnotes

References
Obituary, The Times, 1 August 1956

Further reading

 [A Preface by Rhodes appears in this and subsequent  [2nd, 1941 (published by Canterbury Provincial Buildings Board); and 3rd, 1950 (same publisher as 2nd)] editions of this volume.]

External links

 "The Rhodes Brothers" from the 1966 Encyclopaedia of New Zealand

|-

|-

1861 births
1956 deaths
People from Banks Peninsula
Alumni of Brasenose College, Oxford
Chevaliers of the Légion d'honneur
New Zealand Knights Commander of the Order of the British Empire
New Zealand Knights Commander of the Royal Victorian Order
Knights of Grace of the Order of St John
New Zealand recipients of the Légion d'honneur
Members of the Cabinet of New Zealand
Members of the New Zealand Legislative Council
New Zealand defence ministers
New Zealand farmers
19th-century New Zealand lawyers
Reform Party (New Zealand) MPs
New Zealand military personnel of the Second Boer War
Members of the Inner Temple
New Zealand Army officers
New Zealand philatelists
Burials at St Paul's Cemetery, Christchurch
Philately of New Zealand
Signatories to the Roll of Distinguished Philatelists
Members of the New Zealand House of Representatives
New Zealand MPs for South Island electorates
Unsuccessful candidates in the 1890 New Zealand general election
19th-century New Zealand politicians
New Zealand politicians awarded knighthoods
Moorhouse–Rhodes family